Greenfield is a city in northwestern Hennepin County, Minnesota. It has a population of 2,903 residents, according to the 2020 United States Census, and is located 26.5 miles northwest of Minneapolis. It is part of the Twin Cities Metropolitan Statistical Area.

Geography

Minnesota State Highway 55 serves as the main road in the city. Greenfield is located along the Crow River, which flows through the Downtown River District and divides Hennepin County and Wright County. Nearby towns include Loretto, Rockford, Corcoran, Hanover, Buffalo, and Maple Grove.

History
Before Greenfield was a town, the area was originally known as Greenwood Township. According to the Minnesota Historical Society, Greenfield became incorporated on March 14, 1958.

Education
Greenfield's main school district is Rockford Area School District #883. The school district includes an elementary school (preschool to 4th grade), a middle school (grades 5th through 8th), and a high school (grades 9th through 12th). The elementary focuses mainly on an arts program, while the middle and high schools put more of an emphasis on technology. The Rockford school district was established by the Wright County commissioners on September 6, 1856, and the first school house was constructed by 1860. During the 1960s, the school underwent redistricting that gave its current designation as Independent School District #883.

Although the Rockford school district serves Rockford and most of Greenfield, a small portion of Greenfield is designated to the Buffalo-Hanover-Montrose (BHM) School District #877. Students in the district attend elementary school in Hanover for grades K-5; however, for grades 6–8, students are bussed to Buffalo Community Middle School in Buffalo, Minnesota. The high school for the district, Buffalo High School, is also located in Buffalo. It is known for its arts magnet program. Portions of Greenfield are also located in the Delano school district.

Salem Lutheran School is a Christian Pre-K-8 school of the Wisconsin Evangelical Lutheran Synod in Greenfield.

Places of interest
The Lake Rebecca Park Reserve sits on the southwestern edge of Greenfield. It has a gently rolling landscape and numerous wetland areas. It also has biking trails, a playground, and a boat launch. In addition to the many outdoor opportunities found there, the park is a haven for wildlife.

Demographics

2020 census
As of the 2020 census, there were 2,903 people and 1,039 households in the city.

The median age of a Greenfield resident is 45.1 years. 40.3% of Greenfield residents originate from a German heritage, while 14.8% of residents originate from a Norwegian heritage. Other notable heritages are Polish, Irish, and English.

Greenfield's employment rate is 65.8% with a median household income of $123,817, compared to the $73,382 median household income of Minnesota. 49.3% of residents have received a Bachelor's degree or higher.

In Greenfield, the average resident's commute to work is 31.4 minutes. 86.5% of residents drive to work alone and 9.8% of residents work from home. Top industries that residents work under are Professional, scientific, management, administrative and waste management services (17.8%), Construction (17.1%), Educational services, health care and social assistance (15.3%), Manufacturing (11.8%), and Retail trade (8.5%).

Of Greenfield's residents, 94.2% are homeowners, compared to an average of 71.9% in the state of Minnesota.

2010 census
As of the census of 2010, there were 2,777 people, 936 households, and 771 families residing in the city. The racial makeup of the city was 96.1% White, 0.4% African American, 0.3% Native American, 1.3% Asian, 0.9% from other races, and 0.9% from two or more races. Hispanic or Latino of any race were 1.5% of the population.

There were 936 households, of which 40.2% had children under the age of 18 living with them, 75.3% were married couples living together, 4.5% had a female householder with no husband present, 2.6% had a male householder with no wife present, and 17.6% were non-families. 13.5% of all households were made up of individuals, and 4.1% had someone living alone who was 65 years of age or older. The average household size was 2.97 and the average family size was 3.28.

The median age in the city was 41.1 years. 29.7% of residents were under the age of 18; 6.9% were between the ages of 18 and 24; 20.4% were from 25 to 44; 35.9% were from 45 to 64; and 7.1% were 65 years of age or older. The gender makeup of the city was 50.4% male and 49.6% female.

2000 census
As of the census of 2000, there were 2,544 people, 817 households, and 674 families residing in the city. The racial makeup of the city was 97.72% White, 0.39% African American, 0.24% Native American, 0.63% Asian, 0.20% from other races, and 0.83% from two or more races. Hispanic or Latino of any race were 0.79% of the population.

There were 817 households, out of which 46.6% had children under the age of 18 living with them, 71.5% were married couples living together, 6.1% had a female householder with no husband present, and 17.5% were non-families. 12.0% of all households were made up of individuals, and 2.8% had someone living alone who was 65 years of age or older.  The average household size was 3.11 and the average family size was 3.39.

In the city, the population was spread out, with 33.8% under the age of 18, 7.5% from 18 to 24, 33.7% from 25 to 44, 21.2% from 45 to 64, and 3.8% who were 65 years of age or older.  The median age was 33 years. For every 100 females, there were 105.5 males.  For every 100 females age 18 and over, there were 103.7 males.

The median income for a household in the city was $80,933, and the median income for a family was $86,032. Males had a median income of $50,784 versus $33,875 for females. The per capita income for the city was $29,270.  About 0.7% of families and 2.5% of the population were below the poverty line, including 1.1% of those under age 18 and 2.7% of those age 65 or over.

Politics

References

External links
 City of Greenfield Minnesota Website
 ePodunk: Profile for Greenfield, Minnesota 

Cities in Minnesota
Cities in Hennepin County, Minnesota